Jenson Brooksby was the defending champion but chose not to defend his title.

Wu Tung-lin won the title after defeating Michael Mmoh 6–3, 6–4 in the final.

Seeds

Draw

Finals

Top half

Bottom half

References

External links
Main draw
Qualifying draw

Tallahassee Tennis Challenger - 1
2022 Singles